Ivan Sebastianovich Chernoknizhny was a left socialist-revolutionary and a leading member of the Makhnovist movement.

Biography
Ivan Chernoknizhny was born at the end of the nineteenth century in the Pavlohrad Raion of the Katerynoslav Governorate. In the autumn of 1918, he joined the Makhnovist movement and was elected as a delegate for Novopavlivka to the first, second and third Regional Congresses of Peasants, Workers and Insurgents. At the second congress, he was elected as the first chairman of the Military Revolutionary Council (VRS), after he gave a speech in which he denounced the newly-established Ukrainian Soviet Socialist Republic:

As chairman of the VRS, he oversaw the establishment of the first free soviets in Huliaipole Raion. During his speech at an opening ceremony in Huliaipole, he described the goal of the free soviets to be the establishment of self-governance in Ukraine, outside of the control of any political party. He also noted that Ukrainian peasants had instinctively self-organized many free soviets themselves, indicating widespread popular support for the project. He ended his speech by warning against rising authoritarianism, brought on by both the Bolsheviks and the White movement, calling instead for free soviets to become the nucleus for "real freedom, genuine equality and honest fraternity."

In June 1919, he was outlawed by the Soviet authorities and went underground. He continued to take an active part in the Makhnovist movement, constantly working in the VRS and remaining one of the ideologists of the insurgency. He was again declared an outlaw in January and November 1920. In the 1920s, after the amnesty, he lived in the Mezhova Raion of the Dnipropetrovsk Oblast, where he led the underground Anarcho-Makhnovist group. For his illicit activities, he was arrested in 1928.

References

Bibliography

1890s births
1928 deaths

Year of birth uncertain
Year of death uncertain
Left socialist-revolutionaries
Makhnovshchina
People from Pavlohrad
People of the Russian Civil War
People of the Russian Revolution
Prisoners and detainees of the Soviet Union
Ukrainian anarchists
Ukrainian prisoners and detainees
Ukrainian socialists